The Compendium of the Social Doctrine of the Church, is a 2004 work issued by the Pontifical Council for Justice and Peace to offer "a complete overview of the fundamental framework of the doctrinal corpus of Catholic social teaching." The work was created at the request of Pope John Paul II to consolidate and organize Church social doctrine. The work reads that

"The Church… intends with this document on her social doctrine to propose to all men and women a humanism that is up to the standards of God's plan of love in history, an integral and solidary humanism capable of creating a new social, economic and political order, founded on the dignity and freedom of every human person, to be brought about in peace, justice and solidarity."

The compendium's audience includes bishops, priests, men and women religious (e.g., nuns, deacons), catechists, lay faithful, and all people of good will committed to the common good. Catholic social doctrine is Magisterium, which obligates Catholics to adhere to it.

History
The document was presented by Renato Martino, President of the Pontifical Council for Justice and Peace, on April 2, 2004, the memorial of Francis of Paola. He noted that the document was preceded by Laborem Exercens, Sollicitudo Rei Socialis and Centesimus Annus, wherein John Paul II expounded upon the church's social teaching. The late Pope wanted a compilation of all the church's doctrines on society, so the Pontifical Council for Justice and Peace wrote the Compendium of the Social Doctrine of the Church to him, whom it named the "Master of Social Doctrine and Evangelical Witness to Justice and Peace".

Content
The compendium is divided into three parts, with twelve chapters, an introduction and a conclusion, a letter by Secretary of State Angelo Sodano, and abbreviations for books of the Bible and church documents it references.

Specifically, it deals with questions on divine providence, the church as the mission of Jesus Christ and its social doctrine, the human person and human rights, the family in society, human work and the economy, the political and international communities, the environment, promoting peace, pastoral actions and the activities of the laity.

The conclusion is entitled "For a Civilization of Love".

Chapter Summaries
Chapter 1 presents the theology of Catholic social doctrine. Main ideas include:
 God, the Creator of all things including life itself, freely and “gratuitously” gifts his creation to us and among us. [26, 46]
 Sin breaks our communion with God, our own internal unity, and our relations with fellow men and women, as well as our harmony with all creation. This “estrangement” is at the “deepest roots” of our social, economic, and political “evils”. [27]
 Jesus, by his death and resurrection, offers us the grace to restore our communion with God, and he commands us to “love one another”. [31, 32]
 This commandment is “the ultimate measure and rule of every dynamic related to human relations”. [54]

Chapter 2 focuses on the Church mission and social doctrine. The Gospel message is to be heard, observed, and “put into practice” in every aspect of life. It is not limited to strictly spiritual or other-worldly matters. Church social doctrine informs and guides Christians “in the complex worlds of production, labour, business, finance, trade, politics, law, culture, social communications, where men and women live”. [70]It [Church social doctrine] is the accurate formulation of the results of a careful reflection on the complex realities of human existence, in society and in the international order, in the light of faith and of the Church's tradition. Its main aim is to interpret these realities, determining their conformity with or divergence from the lines of the Gospel teaching on man and his vocation, a vocation which is at once earthly and transcendent; its aim is thus to guide Christian behaviour. [72]Additionally, this chapter summarizes milestones in Catholic social doctrine, beginning with the Encyclical Rerum Novarum: On Capital and Labor by Pope Leo XIII in 1891.

Chapter 3 develops “human dignity” as the foundation of all Catholic social teaching. [107] This inalienable dignity is received from God himself, and it is the basis of dignity among all men and women. [144]A just society can become a reality only when it is based on the respect of the transcendent dignity of the human person. The person represents the ultimate end of society, by which it is ordered to the person… Every political, economic, social, scientific and cultural programme must be inspired by the awareness of the primacy of each human being over society. [132]

In no case, therefore, is the human person to be manipulated for ends that are foreign to his own development… The person cannot be a means for carrying out economic, social or political projects imposed by some authority, even in the name of an alleged progress of the civil community as a whole or of other persons, either in the present or the future. [133]This chapter also describes “social sin” and “structures of sin”. Though all sins are committed by individuals, social sins have as “their very object a direct assault on one's neighbour… and community” [118]. Structures of sin condition human behavior to commit other sins. Two such structures are “all-consuming desire for profit” and “the thirst for power, with the intention of imposing one's will upon others” [119].

Chapter 4 introduces and elaborates on the four principles of Catholic social teaching: dignity of the human person, common good, subsidiarity, and solidarity. [160] These principles have “unity… reciprocity, complementarities and interconnectedness” [162] which must be understood and considered to correctly use them for “interpreting and evaluating social phenomena” [161].

Dignity of the Human Person is the foundation of all Catholic social teaching, and it was described previously in Chapter 3.

Common Good is defined as “the sum total of social conditions which allow people, either as groups or as individuals, to reach their fulfilment more fully and more easily”. [164] All social groups, from family to nations, have their common good as “this is a constitutive element of its significance and the authentic reason for its very existence”. [165]These demands concern above all the commitment to peace, the organization of the State's powers, a sound juridical system, the protection of the environment, and the provision of essential services to all, some of which are at the same time human rights: food, housing, work, education and access to culture, transportation, basic health care, the freedom of communication and expression, and the protection of religious freedom. [166]Universal Destination of Goods is an implication of the common good. God is “the original source of all that is good” and gave the Earth to all of us for our sustenance, development, and enjoyment. [171]The universal destination of goods entails obligations on how goods are to be used by their legitimate owners. Individual persons may not use their resources without considering the effects that this use will have, rather they must act in a way that benefits not only themselves and their family but also the common good. [178]Preferential Option for the Poor is a requirement of the Universal Destination of Goods. It necessitates “that the poor, the marginalized and in all cases those whose living conditions interfere with their proper growth should be the focus of particular concern”. [182].The poor remain entrusted to us and it is this responsibility upon which we shall be judged at the end of time… Our Lord warns us that we shall be separated from him if we fail to meet the serious needs of the poor and the little ones who are his brethren. [183]Subsidiarity directs decision-making, administration, and activities toward smaller and more local social units (e.g., family, neighborhood, village) with the larger and higher-level units (e.g., state, nation) providing help, support, promotion, and development. [186] It encourages proper and essential participation by individuals and intermediate groups, which fosters freedom and initiative, and it also protects against abuses by higher-level authorities [187], especially regarding totalitarian and dictatorial regimes. [191]

Solidarity is a “firm and persevering determination to commit oneself to the common good”. [193] It highlights both “the equality of all in dignity and rights” [192], as well as our neighbor as “the living image of God the Father”. [196]

Additionally, Church social doctrine includes four fundamental values: truth, freedom, justice, and love. [197]

Chapter 5 presents specific Church teachings about family. The family is the “first natural society… and the centre of social life”. [211] Family is where we receive our “first formative ideas about truth and goodness, and… what it means to love and to be loved”. [212] Society and the State must observe the principle of subsidiarity regarding the family, both respecting the rights and responsibilities of the family, as well as supporting and honoring family. [214, 252]

Major topics in this chapter include: marriage, children including education and protection, elderly people, sexual identity, divorce, de facto unions, procreation, contraception, abortion, reproductive techniques, and work including women and family wage.

Chapter 6 presents and develops “work” as a right and a good, as well as a duty and obligation for all who are capable. [264, 287, 288] Work is a fundamental part of our human vocation, to cultivate and care for creation. [256] Additionally, work provides us with a means for obtaining sustenance [257], and it helps us care for our neighbor and contribute to the common good. [266]Any form of materialism or economic tenet that tries to reduce the worker to being a mere instrument of production… would end up hopelessly distorting the essence of work and stripping it of its most noble and basic human finality. The human person is the measure of the dignity of work. [271]A “just wage” is a key principle for justice in work relationships. Failure to pay a timely and just wage is a “grave” sin. [302]

The rights of workers, which are based on inherent human dignity, are also central to justice in work relationships. Church Magisterium lists some of those rights: just wage; rest; working environment and manufacturing processes which are not harmful to the workers' physical health or moral integrity; safeguards against affronts to one's conscience or personal dignity; unemployment compensation; pension for old age, sickness, and work-related accidents; maternity benefits; and assembly and forming associations. [301]

Other major topics in this chapter include: Sabbath and rest, labor and capital including ownership, full employment, family, women, child labor, immigrants, agricultural labor, income redistribution, unions, striking, solidarity, and globalization.

Chapter 7 elaborates on economic life for human dignity and the common good. All aspects of our economic life (e.g., work, spending, investment, wealth) “must be placed at the service of man and society”. [326]. The Universal Destination of Goods reveals that economic goods are “divine gifts to be administered and shared” [324] and must be “used properly” by those to whom “God has entrusted” it. [326, 328] Misuse of economic goods and riches is condemned, including “fraud, usury, exploitation and gross injustice, especially when directed against the poor”. [323]

Business owners, leaders, and managers are specifically addressed because of their central role in business operations, which effects the economy as well as society in general. [344] They must both operate efficient businesses according to business principles (e.g., initiative, profit, free market), and they also must do so promoting human dignity and development, and advancing the common good. [338, 340]Those whose usurious and avaricious dealings lead to the hunger and death of their brethren in the human family indirectly commit homicide, which is imputable to them. [341]The State has a two-part balancing role as well. Business and government work together and “complement each other mutually”. [353]The action of the State and of other public authorities must be consistent with the principle of subsidiarity and create situations favourable to the free exercise of economic activity. It must also be inspired by the principle of solidarity and establish limits for the autonomy of the parties in order to defend those who are weaker. [351]Consumers are another group specifically addressed. All of us must consider the moral implications and societal impact of our purchases and investments, especially regarding justice and solidarity. Our “duty to charity” must be remembered. [358, 359]To counteract this phenomenon [consumerism] it is necessary to create ‘life-styles in which the quest for truth, beauty, goodness and communion with others for the sake of common growth are the factors which determine consumer choices, savings and investments’. [360]Major topics in this chapter include: wealth and riches, capitalism, private initiative, business initiative, profit, usury and exploitation, ownership, management, consumerism, free market, taxation, government policy and regulation, non-profit organizations, and globalization including trade and international financial systems.

Chapter 8 focuses on political life. The human person is the foundation and purpose of political life. Each person is responsible for his or her choices and has autonomy to pursue activities that give meaning to life. The political community exists for the integral development of each of its members, striving for the common good. [384, 385]Political authority must guarantee an ordered and upright community life without usurping the free activity of individuals and groups but disciplining and orienting this freedom, by respecting and defending the independence of the individual and social subjects, for the attainment of the common good… at the service of integral human growth… within the limits of morality and… according to a juridical order. [394]Topics in this chapter include: freedom, authority and service, minority groups, civil friendship and fraternity, human rights, inequalities, just laws, disobedience and resistance, due process of law, punishment and rehabilitation, torture, capital punishment, democracy, political corruption, media and misinformation, and religious freedom.

Chapter 9 applies the principles of Catholic social teaching to the international community. God is the God of the whole world, all nations, the entire human family. [428, 430] Though the Church recognizes national sovereignty, national sovereignty is not absolute. [435] Disagreement, conflicts, and tensions between nations must be resolved peacefully with justice, promoting the universal common good of the entire human family. [432, 433, 438]

Topics in this chapter include: international law, United Nations, Holy See, globalization, international market, poverty, underdevelopment, and foreign debt.

Chapter 10 deepens our understanding of the environment and our duty to care for and tend to the world and all creation. Our world is the garden God created for and gifted to us. He entrusts us with the “privileged position” of its responsible and harmonious care, use, management, and development. [451, 452] This responsibility extends to us as individuals as well as in our larger communities, including specific judicial and governmental obligations (e.g., the right to a safe and healthy natural environment). [468]Care for the environment represents a challenge for all of humanity. It is a matter of a common and universal duty, that of respecting a common good, destined for all, by preventing anyone from using ‘with impunity the different categories of beings, whether living or inanimate — animals, plants, the natural elements — simply as one wishes, according to one's own economic needs’. [466]The doctrine recognizes that our world is “not a sacred or divine reality that man must leave alone”. Human activities that improve living beings or the natural environment are “praiseworthy”, while activities that damage them “deserve condemnation”. [473]

Furthermore, scientific and technological advances are a “wonderful product of a God-given human creativity” and enhance our lives, communities, and world. [457] However, these advances “can be used either for man's progress or for his degradation”. [458]A central point of reference for every scientific and technological application is respect for men and women, which must also be accompanied by a necessary attitude of respect for other living creatures. [459]Other topics in this chapter include: biotechnology, energy resources, indigenous people, consumerism, market inadequacies, disadvantaged people, poverty, and water.

Chapter 11 examines peace, violence, and war. Peace is an attribute of God. [488] It is a gift God offers to us. [489] Peace also is a value and duty, and it is the fruit of justice and love. [494]The promotion of peace in the world is an integral part of the Church's mission of continuing Christ's work of redemption on earth… The promotion of true peace is an expression of Christian faith in the love that God has for every human being. From a liberating faith in God's love there arises a new vision of the world and a new way of approaching others, whether the other is an individual or an entire people. [516]Violence and war are the consequences of sin. They are not acceptable solutions, though self-defense is allowed within the limits of necessity and proportionality. [496, 497, 501]

The many topics in this chapter also include: international law, United Nations, defense, armed forces, military personnel including duty and resistance, conscientious objectors, civil populations, refugees, war crimes, genocide, sanctions, arms race, disarmament, deterrence, weapons of mass destruction and indiscriminate killing, small arms, weapons trafficking, non-governmental militias, child soldiers, terrorism, and prayer (e.g., World Day of Peace).

Chapter 12 emphasizes ecclesial action connected to Catholic social teaching, and it provides guidance about that activity. Catholic social teaching “is neither taught nor known sufficiently, which is part of the reason for its failure to be suitably reflected in concrete behaviour”. [528] Faith formation, especially catechesis, should include “intense and constant work” [531] on it and must present its “entirety” and “fullness”. [529]

The bishops are responsible for promoting Catholic social doctrine “assisted by priests, religious men and women, and the laity”. [539]Through suitable formation programmes, the priest should make known the social teaching of the Church and foster in the members of his community an awareness of their right and duty to be active subjects of this doctrine. [540]The lay faithful have unique and important responsibilities because of their secular work in the world [541], which demands unifying their “spiritual” and “secular” lives [546]. This includes both daily activities in cultural, social, economic and political spheres, as well as involvement in larger issues in these spheres (e.g., common good, freedom, justice, and also social sin, structures of sin, dehumanization, institutionalized exploitation, systemic racism). [531]The first form in which this task is undertaken consists in the commitment and efforts to renew oneself interiorly… It is from the conversion of hearts that there arises concern for others, loved as brothers or sisters. This concern helps us to understand the obligation and commitment to heal institutions, structures and conditions of life that are contrary to human dignity. [552]

Editions
The compendium is available online at the Vatican website. It also can be purchased as a printed book, which runs about 250 pages in the English edition, plus an additional 200 pages of back matter.

References

External links
 Compendium of the Social Doctrine of the Church, official English translation
Ramdeen, L., Catholic Commission for Social Justice of the Diocese of Port of Spain (Trinidad and Tobago), Understanding the Church's Social Teaching, series of articles on each part of the Compendium, published in 2005-2009. Only the 2005 and 2006 series are available online. 

Catholic social teaching
Pontifical Council for Justice and Peace
2004 documents
2004 in Christianity